The Roman Catholic Diocese of Loikaw (Lat: Diocesis Loikavensis) is a diocese of the Latin Church of the Roman Catholic Church in Burma.

Erected in 1988, the diocese was created from the Archdiocese of Taunggyi, and remains a suffragan of the parent.

The diocese is currently vacant.

Ordinaries
Sotero Phamo (Thein Myint) (14 Nov 1988 Appointed - 26 Apr 2014 Resigned)
Stephen Tjephe (15 Nov 2014 Appointed - 16 Dec 2020 Died)

See also
Catholic Church in Burma

Loikaw
Christian organizations established in 1988
Roman Catholic dioceses and prelatures established in the 20th century
1988 establishments in Burma